A visard (also spelled vizard) is an oval mask of black velvet, worn by travelling women in the 16th century to protect their skin from sunburn. The fashion of the period for wealthy women was to keep their skin pale, because a tan suggested that the bearer worked outside and was hence poor. Some types of vizard were not held in place by a fastening or ribbon ties, and instead the wearer clasped a bead attached to the interior of the mask between their teeth. 

The practice did not meet universal approval, as evidenced in this excerpt from a contemporary polemic:

A visard recovered from inside the wall of a 16th-century building in Daventry, England.

In Venice, the visard developed into a design without a mouth hole, the moretta, and was gripped with a button between the teeth rather than a bead. The mask's prevention of speech was deliberate, intended to heighten the mystery of a masked woman even further.

A Spanish observer at the wedding of Mary I of England and Philip II of Spain in 1554 mentioned that women in London wore masks, antifaces, or veils when walking outside. In Scotland in the 1590s Anne of Denmark wore masks when horse riding. These were faced with black satin, lined with taffeta, and supplied with Florentine ribbon for fastening and for decoration. At the Union of Crowns in 1603, she travelled to England in June, and it was said she had done "some wrong" to her complexion "for in all this journey she hath worn no mask". In 1620 the lawyer and courtier John Coke sent clothes and costume from London to his wife at Much Marcle, including a satin mask and two green masks for their children. Visards experienced a resurgence in the 1660s, as Samuel Pepys notes in his diary on June 12, 1663: "Lady Mary Cromwell... put on her vizard, and so kept it on all the play; which of late is become a great fashion among the ladies, which hides their whole face." Later that day, Mr. Pepys bought his wife a vizard.

Citations

See also
 1550–1600 in Western European fashion

References

External links
 Details of a visard in the collection of the Norwich Castle Museum
 A miniature visard made for a 17th-century child's doll in the collection of the Victoria and Albert Museum



16th-century fashion
16th century in Europe
17th-century fashion
17th century in Europe
History of clothing (Western fashion)
Masks